The following is an incomplete list of association football clubs based in Eritrea.

For a complete list see :Category:Football clubs in Eritrea

A
Adulis Club
Air Force F.C.
Al Tahrir
Asmara Brewery

B
Bet Mekae FC

C
C.H. Star

D
Dahlak SC
Denden F.C.

E
Edaga Hamus

G
GS Asmara

H
Hintsa FC

K
Keren FC

M
Mai Anbessa
Mai Temenai FC
Medlaw Megbi

R
Red Sea F.C.

T
Tele S.C.
Tesfa FC

Football clubs
 
Eritrea
Football clubs